Jean Ersfeld (born c.1953) is a politician from Luxembourg.

Background and political stances

He founded the Free Party of Luxembourg (FPL) in 2003 and led it in Luxembourg's legislative elections in 2004.  None of the FPL's candidates, including Ersfeld, was elected. 
 
Ersfeld, like most of the FPL's candidates, is from the Oesling region of Luxembourg, a sparsely populated area which is characterized by its relative remoteness from the south of Luxembourg. Jean Ersfeld is a local personality with a limited following in that region, who previously stood for election for the leftist Déi Lénk. Since the FPL took an essentially right-wing nationalist position, this marked a notable political metamorphosis for Ersfeld.

After the FPL ceased to function, Ersfeld later ran for the Citizens' List in the 2009 Luxembourgian legislative election.

Subsequently, Ersfeld stood as a candidate for déi Konservativ (en."The Conservatives") of politician Joe Thein for the South in the Luxembourg general election, 2018.

See also

 Free Party of Luxembourg#Regionally based support: leadership and manifesto

References

External links
https://web.archive.org/web/20070607005730/http://www.land.lu/html/dossiers/dossier_legislatives/fpl_060204.html 
http://images.newmedia.lu/rtl.lu/news/wahlen2004/site/candidat/185x229/408.jpg (photo)

Luxembourgian politicians
1953 births
Living people
Citizens' List politicians